Shanidze is a surname. Notable people with the surname include: 

Akaki Shanidze (1887–1987), Georgian linguist and philologist
Dito Shanidze (1937–2010), Soviet weightlifter
Irakly Shanidze (born 1968), Georgian-American creative director and photographer
Tamara Shanidze (born 1969), Georgian sprinter